Amanpulo is an island resort on Pamalican Island in Palawan, Philippines. It is owned by Seven Seas Resorts and Leisure, Inc., and Aman Resorts. The resort is majority-owned by the ANSCOR (the Philippine Constitution  does not allow 100% foreign ownership of businesses in the Philippines). The name Amanpulo came from Aman which is Sanskrit for peace and pulo means island in Tagalog. The twinning of the two words results in the coining of "Amanpulo" or "peace island" in reference to the tranquil island of Pamalican.

Access to the resort from Manila is through Ninoy Aquino International Airport where private charter airlines operate. The resort is serviced by Island Aviation of the Soriano Group. Private charter airlines also may provide flight to the island through its private airstrip.

The resort has villas and casitas for visitors, each with its own buggy for travel on the island.

Each villa features a private swimming pool and offers separate bedroom, living and dining pavilions, an outdoor lounge and a kitchen. One, two and four bedroom villas are available. All villas come with a cook and housekeeper, and a number enjoy beautiful garden settings.

In November 2006, pursuant to Proclamation No. 1179, the resort was declared a special tourism economic zone by President Gloria Macapagal Arroyo.

References

External links
Official site

Resorts in the Philippines
Aman Resorts
Buildings and structures in Palawan